Dr John Charles Lill (born 7 December 1933) is a former Australian first-class cricketer who represented South Australia. He was a member of the South Australian team which won the Sheffield Shield in 1963/64.

A right-handed top order batsman, Lill was good enough to tour New Zealand in 1959/60 with the Australian team. He played two matches against New Zealand but they weren't given Test status. This was because it was in effect a 'Second XI', with the first choice players given a rest after back to back tours of India and Pakistan. Lill fared poorly in his four innings, scoring 1, 15, 6 and 0.

Back home, Lill had his most prolific season in 1960/61 when he amassed 809 runs in all first-class fixtures, at an average of 42.57. His only first-class wicket was Victorian batsman Jack Potter, whom he dismissed for 156, caught by Barry Jarman in 1962.

Lill was also a talented footballer and played in the South Australian National Football League (SANFL) with Norwood. A centre half forward, Lill was Norwood's top goal-kicker in 1961 and 1962, with 40 and 52 goals respectively. He participated in the famous 1961 'Bloodbath' Grand Final against West Adelaide. His father Alick Lill won a Magarey Medal during his time at Norwood.

In 1983 he was appointed as Secretary of the Melbourne Cricket Club and also served as CEO. He remained in this role until 2000. Lill holds a Bachelor of Chemical Engineering from the University of Adelaide.

References

External links

1933 births
Living people
Australian cricketers
South Australia cricketers
Australian rules footballers from South Australia
Norwood Football Club players
Cricketers from Adelaide